1232 Cortusa, provisional designation , is a background asteroid from the outer regions of the asteroid belt, approximately  in diameter. It was discovered on 10 October 1931, by astronomer Karl Reinmuth at the Heidelberg Observatory in southwest Germany. The X-type asteroid has a rotation period of 25.2 hours. It was named after the plant Cortusa and indirectly honors astronomer Gustav Stracke.

Orbit and classification 

Cortusa is a non-family asteroid from the main belt's background population. It orbits the Sun in the outer main-belt at a distance of 2.8–3.6 AU once every 5 years and 8 months (2,073 days; semi-major axis of 3.18 AU). Its orbit has an eccentricity of 0.13 and an inclination of 10° with respect to the ecliptic.

Naming 

This minor planet was named after the flowering plant Cortusa, a species of plant in the primrose family. The official  was mentioned in The Names of the Minor Planets by Paul Herget in 1955. It honors German astronomer and diligent orbit computer Gustav Stracke (1887–1943), who had asked that no asteroid be named after him. The initials of the asteroids  through , all discovered by Karl Reinmuth, spell out "G. Stracke". In this manner, Reinmuth was able to circumvent Stracke's desire and honor him nevertheless. The asteroid 1019 Strackea was later named after Stracke directly. The consecutive initial letters of these minor-planet names spell out "MarsdenB".

Reinmuth's flowers 

Due to his many discoveries, Karl Reinmuth submitted a large list of 66 newly named asteroids in the early 1930s. This list also contained a sequence of 28 asteroids, starting with 1054 Forsytia, that were all named after plants, in particular flowering plants (also see list of minor planets named after animals and plants).

Physical characteristics 

In the SDSS-based taxonomy, Cortusa is an X-type asteroid.

Rotation period 

In August 2004, a rotational lightcurve of Cortusa was obtained from photometric observations by French amateur astronomer Pierre Antonini. Lightcurve analysis gave a rotation period of  hours with a brightness amplitude of 0.10 magnitude. Other period determinations were made by René Roy (<10 h) in December 2006, and by the Spanish OBAS group (22.05 h) in June 2016.

Diameter and albedo 

According to the surveys carried out by the Infrared Astronomical Satellite IRAS, the Japanese Akari satellite and the NEOWISE mission of NASA's Wide-field Infrared Survey Explorer, Cortusa measures between 33.13 and 43.27 kilometers in diameter and its surface has an albedo between 0.07 and 0.14. The Collaborative Asteroid Lightcurve Link derives an albedo of 0.1226 and a diameter of 33.05 kilometers based on an absolute magnitude of 10.3.

References

External links 
 Asteroid Lightcurve Database (LCDB), query form (info )
 Dictionary of Minor Planet Names, Google books
 Asteroids and comets rotation curves, CdR – Observatoire de Genève, Raoul Behrend
 Discovery Circumstances: Numbered Minor Planets (1)-(5000) – Minor Planet Center
 
 

001232
Discoveries by Karl Wilhelm Reinmuth
Named minor planets
19311010